Teschl is a surname. Notable people with the surname include:

Gerald Teschl (born 1970), Austrian mathematician, married to Susanne
Michael Teschl (born 1971), Danish singer, composer and writer
Susanne Teschl (born 1970), Austrian mathematician, married to Gerald